John Stewart (date of birth unknown; died 1820) was a United States representative from Pennsylvania. He is known to have completed preparatory studies. From 1789 to 1796, he was elected as a Democratic-Republican to the Sixth Congress to fill the vacancy caused by the death of Thomas Hartley. He was reelected as a Republican to the Seventh and Eighth Congresses, holding office from January 15, 1801 to March 3, 1805. He died in Elmwood, near York, in Spring Garden Township. Interment was on his estate near Elmwood.

References

Stewart, John (Pennsylvania)
Stewart, John (Pennsylvania)
Stewart, John (Pennsylvania)
Democratic-Republican Party members of the United States House of Representatives from Pennsylvania